The Harden-Murrumburrah Express or The Harden Murrumburrah Express  is an Australian weekly paper in New South Wales.

The Express started in 1947 and continues to present (2015). The State Library NSW holds microform of the newspaper beginning in 1947.  The Express serves the regional towns of Harden, Berremangra, Binalong, Cunningar, Galong, Jugiong, Murrumburrah, Wallendbeen and Wombat.

History 
In January 1947 Harden Express and Murrumburrah Signal and County of Harden Advocate amalgamated to form Harden-Murrumburrah Express. Harden Murrumburrah Express was sold to Rural Press Limited or RPL on 28 September 1990, previously being owned by J.A. Bradley (Holdings) Limited.

See also  
 List of newspapers in Australia
 List of newspapers in New South Wales

References

External links 
 Country Conscience
 Centenary of Harden-Murrumburrah Express 1881-1981
 Harden Murrumburrah Express (Official Website)

Newspapers published in New South Wales
Publications established in 1947
Weekly newspapers published in Australia